Paranoid is a British crime drama, which began broadcasting on ITV on 22 September 2016, and streaming internationally on Netflix in 2016. The eight-part series focuses on a group of UK detectives working for the fictional Woodmere police force attempting to solve the murder of a local doctor who is stabbed at a children's playground. During the course of their investigation, the detectives discover the murder has links to a German pharmaceutical company and they enlist the help of their German colleagues in Düsseldorf to find the killer. Indira Varma, Robert Glenister, and Dino Fetscher star as main protagonists DS Nina Suresh, DC Bobby Day, and DC Alec Wayfield, respectively.

Plot
Angela Benton, a well-liked local GP in the fictional town of Woodmere, is stabbed to death in a local children's playground. A team of detectives from Woodmere Police are assigned to investigate the case, including: DS Nina Suresh (Indira Varma), DC Bobby Day (Robert Glenister), DC Alec Wayfield (Dino Fetscher), and their supervising officer, DI Michael Niles (Neil Stuke). They initially suspect the murderer is a local mental patient, Jacob Appley, who is under the care of psychiatrist Dr. Chris Crowley (Michael Maloney). When Appley is later found dead, his brother, Henry (William Ash), is convinced that Jacob was not responsible for the murder, and has been framed by a party or parties unknown.

Meanwhile, an unidentified man (Kevin Doyle), dubbed the "Ghost Detective", is sending the team information and clues to evidence that could identify Angela's killer. As the investigation continues, the team discovers Angela's death could be linked to her ex-boyfriend, Ruben Lukana. The team enlists the help of Düsseldorf detective Linda Felber (Christiane Paul) to look into Lukana. When he is found dead face down in his swimming pool, Felber and her partner, Walti Merian (Dominik Tiefenthaler), begin an investigation. A suspect for the murders is identified, but when he evades capture and flees back to Germany, Niles arranges for Bobby to travel to Düsseldorf to assist with the German investigation.

Cast
 Indira Varma as DS Nina Suresh, Woodmere Police detective
 Robert Glenister as DC Bobby Day, Woodmere Police detective
 Dino Fetscher as DC Alec Wayfield, Woodmere Police detective
 Neil Stuke as DI Michael Niles, Woodmere Police detective
 Christiane Paul as Detective Linda Felber, Düsseldorf Polizei detective
 Lesley Sharp as Lucy Cannonbury, chief witness to Angela Benton's murder
 Michael Maloney as Chris Crowley, psychiatrist
 Kevin Doyle as the Ghost Detective
 Dominik Tiefenthaler as Detective Walti Merian, Düsseldorf Polizei detective
 Polly Walker as Monica Wayfield, Alec Wayfield's mother
 Anjli Mohindra as PC Megan Waters, Woodmere Police staff
 Danny Huston as Nick Waingrow, Director of External Affairs, Rustin Wade Pharmaceuticals

Recurring characters
 Jason Done as Dennis, Nina Suresh's long-term boyfriend
 John Duttine as Eric Benton, Angela Benton's father
 William Flanagan as Luke Benton, Angela Benton's son
 Shobna Gulati as Parcival, Bobby Day's GP
 William Ash as Henry Appley, Jacob Appley's brother
 Ayda Field as Sheri, Ruben Lukana's American girlfriend
 Nikol Kollars as Marquito Olivo, mother of Ruben Lukana's son
 Jonathan Ojinnaka, "the bald man"
 Emma Bispham as Angela Benton, murder victim
 Daniel Drewes as Cedric Felber, Linda Felber's husband
 Isabella Pappas as Sadie Waingrow, Nick Waingrow's daughter

Episodes

Series 1 (2016)

References

External links

2016 British television series debuts
2016 British television series endings
2010s British crime drama television series
English-language Netflix original programming
ITV television dramas
British detective television series
2010s British mystery television series
Murder in television
Obsessive–compulsive disorder in fiction
Television series by Red Production Company
Television series by StudioCanal
Television shows set in Cheshire
Television shows set in Germany